New Pittsburg is an unincorporated community in Jackson Township, Randolph County, in the U.S. state of Indiana.

History
New Pittsburg was platted in 1856. The community took its name from Pittsburgh, Pennsylvania. A post office was established at New Pittsburgh in 1858, and remained in operation until 1907.

Geography

References

Unincorporated communities in Randolph County, Indiana
Unincorporated communities in Indiana